Red and black may refer to:

Media 
 The Red & Black (University of Georgia), the student newspaper at the University of Georgia
 Red & Black (Washington & Jefferson College), the student newspaper at Washington & Jefferson College

Cards 
 Red and Black (solitaire), a patience game
 Rouge et Noir (patience) (French for Red and Black), a different patience game
 Red and black (card trick)

Other
 Red and Black Cafe, a coffee shop in Portland, Oregon
 RED/BLACK concept, in cryptography
 Red–black tree, a data structure
 "Red and Black", a song from the 1980 musical Les Miserables
 The red and black banner a symbol of anarcho-syndicalism and anarcho-communism
 Red and Black Flags

Other uses
 The Red and the Black, a 1830 novel by the French author Stendhal
 Red and Black (film), a 1955 Italian film

See also
 Red and Black Light, a 2015 album by Ibrahim Maalouf
 Black and Red (disambiguation)
 Black (disambiguation)
 Red (disambiguation)
 Red-black (disambiguation)
 The Red and the Black (disambiguation)